= Unidade Castelhanos Formation =

Geological formation in Portugal

- Stratigraphic range: Late Jurassic
- Type: Geological formation

Location
- Country: Portugal

The Unidade Castelhanos Formation is a Mesozoic geologic formation. Dinosaur remains diagnostic to the genus level are among the fossils that have been recovered from the formation.

== Paleofauna ==
- Astrodon pusillus

== See also ==
- List of dinosaur-bearing rock formations
